Kirkwood/La Salle station is a light rail station on the Muni Metro T Third Street line in the Bayview neighborhood of San Francisco, California. The station opened with the T Third Street line on January 13, 2007. It has a single island platform located in the median of Third Street between Kirkwood Avenue and La Salle Avenue, with access from crosswalks at both streets.

References

External links 

SFMTA: Third Street & Kirkwood/La Salle northbound, southbound
SF Bay Transit (unofficial): Third Street/Kirkwood/La Salle

Muni Metro stations
Railway stations in the United States opened in 2007